Fabien Claude (born 22 December 1994) is a French biathlete.

Career
His first year in biathlon was 2006. He made his international debut in 2011. He won the Junior Men's pursuit and placed 2nd with the French relay team at the Biathlon Junior World Championships 2014. He was part of the French relay team that achieved 3rd place in the relay in Hochfilzen during the 2019–20 season. His first individual podium position was 3rd place in the individual discipline in Pokljuka during the 2019–20 season. His second podium was 2nd place in the pursuit in Kontiolahti during the 2020–21 season. His brothers Florent Claude and Emilien Claude are also biathletes.

Biathlon results
All results are sourced from the International Biathlon Union.

Olympic Games
1 medal (1 silver)

World Championships
1 medal (1 gold)

*The single mixed relay was added as an event in 2019.

World Cup
World Cup rankings

Relay victories
4 victories

References

External links

1994 births
Living people
Sportspeople from Épinal
French male biathletes
Biathletes at the 2012 Winter Youth Olympics
Biathletes at the 2022 Winter Olympics
Medalists at the 2022 Winter Olympics
Olympic biathletes of France
Olympic silver medalists for France
Olympic medalists in biathlon
21st-century French people
Biathlon World Championships medalists